Molholm Shoal is a shoal area  west of Molholm Island in the Windmill Islands of Antarctica.

References

External links

Barrier islands of Antarctica
Islands of Wilkes Land